GITP may refer to:

Giant in the Playground, publishing company owned and operated by Rich Burlew
Grounded into triple play, in baseball